Theophilus is a masculine given name. Theophilus or Theofilos may also refer to:

 Theophilus (crater), on the Moon
 MS Theofilos, a passenger/vehicle ferry built in 1975
 Theophilus (comic strip), an American religious comic strip from 1966 to 2002
 Theofilos (film), a 1987 Greek film about painter Theofilos Hatzimichail
 Theophilos (emperor), Byzantine emperor